Beauty is a 2022 American drama film directed by Andrew Dosunmu from a screenplay by Lena Waithe. It premiered at the 2022 Tribeca Film Festival and was released on Netflix on June 29, 2022. It stars Gracie Marie Bradley, Niecy Nash, Giancarlo Esposito, Sharon Stone, Andre Ozim, Michael Ward, and Kyle Bary.

Synopsis 
A young singer on the brink of stardom is determined to hold on to her identity amid her rising fame and the oppressive household of her religious parents.

Cast 
 Gracie Marie Bradley as Beauty
 Niecy Nash as Beauty's Mother
 Aleyse Shannon as Jasmine
 Giancarlo Esposito as Beauty's Father
 Kyle Bary as Abel
 Micheal Ward as Cain
 Sharon Stone as Colonizer
 Andre Ozim as Preacher

Reception 
On review aggregator Rotten Tomatoes, Beauty holds an approval rating of 22% based on 18 reviews, with an average rating of 5.10/10.

References

External links 

 

2022 films
2020s English-language films
American drama films
English-language Netflix original films
Films directed by Andrew Dosunmu
2020s American films